Guido Kangur (born 9 June 1956 in Kohtla-Järve) is an Estonian actor.

In 1980 he graduated from Tallinn State Conservatory. From 1980 to 1992 he was an actor in Noorsooteater. Since 1992 he is an actor in Estonian Drama Theatre. He has also played in many films and theater plays.

Selected filmography
 Names in Marble (2002)
 Ruudi (2006)
 Farts of Fury (2011)
 Elu keset linna (2012)
 The Wall (2012)
 Living Images (2013)
 It Flies to the Hive  (2015)
 Üheotsapilet (2015)
 The Manslayer/The Virgin/The Shadow (2017)
 Deserved Happiness (2018)
 On The Water (2020)
 Salmonid 25 aastat hiljem (2020)
 Kuulsuse narrid (2023)

References

1956 births
Living people
Estonian male stage actors
Estonian male television actors
Estonian male film actors
20th-century Estonian male actors
21st-century Estonian male actors
Estonian Academy of Music and Theatre alumni
Recipients of the Order of the White Star, 4th Class
People from Kohtla-Järve